Vich may refer to:

Places

Vich, Switzerland
Vigo di Fassa, Italy
Spanish form of Vic, Catalonia, Spain

People

'-vich', an East Slavic patronymic suffix